

The Kay Gyroplane Type 33/1 was a 1930s British single-seat autogiro design by David Kay.

Design and development
David Kay had first flown an autogiro (the Type 32/1) in 1932 but it was damaged in early 1933 and not repaired. Kay then designed a larger single-seat autogiro, the Type 33/1 and contracted Oddie, Bradbury and Cull Limited of Southampton to build two fuselages.

The first autogiro, registered G-ACVA, first flew on 18 February 1935 from Eastleigh Airport. The second autogiro was not completed. Following the last flight of G-ACVA on 16 August 1947 at Perth Airport (Scotland) at Scone, it was stored there for many years. It was then refurbished at Scone in 1967 and loaned to the Museum of Transport, Glasgow.
The autogyro was then purchased from the Kay family by the National Museums Scotland and is on display in the main museum building in Chambers Street, Edinburgh.

Variants
Type 32/1
Single-seat autogiro powered by an ABC Scorpion piston engine.
Type 33/1
Single-seat autogiro powered by a Pobjoy R piston engine.

Aircraft on display
On display at National Museum of Scotland in Edinburgh, Scotland.

Specifications

See also

References

Notes

Bibliography

1930s British civil utility aircraft
Single-engined tractor autogyros
Aircraft first flown in 1935